Roberto Menéndez (born 9 October 1949) is a Cuban former cyclist. He competed at the 1968, 1972 and the 1976 Summer Olympics as well as the 1971 and 1975 Pan American Games.

At the 1971 Pan American Games in Cali, Colombia, he won a gold medal for the Men's Team Time Trial event alongside Gregorio Aldo Arencibia, Pedro Rodríguez, and Galio Albolo. At the 1975 Pan American Games in Mexico City, he won the silver medal for the same event alongside Aldo Arencibia, Carlos Cardet, and José Prieto.

References

External links
 

1949 births
Living people
Cuban male cyclists
Olympic cyclists of Cuba
Cyclists at the 1968 Summer Olympics
Cyclists at the 1972 Summer Olympics
Cyclists at the 1976 Summer Olympics
Place of birth missing (living people)
Pan American Games medalists in cycling
Pan American Games gold medalists for Cuba
Cyclists at the 1971 Pan American Games
Pan American Games silver medalists for Cuba
Cyclists at the 1975 Pan American Games
Medalists at the 1975 Pan American Games
20th-century Cuban people
21st-century Cuban people